Steak sauce is a tangy sauce commonly served as a condiment for beef in the United States. Two of its major producers are British companies, and the sauce is similar to the "brown sauce" of British cuisine.

Overview

Steak sauce is normally brown in color, and often made from tomatoes, spices, vinegar, and raisins, and sometimes anchovies. The taste is either tart or sweet, with a peppery taste similar to Worcestershire sauce. Three major brands in the U.S. are the British Lea & Perrins, the United States Heinz 57, and the British Henderson's A1 Sauce once sold in the United States as "A1 Steak Sauce" before being renamed "A.1. Sauce". There are also numerous regional brands that feature a variety of flavor profiles. Several smaller companies and specialty producers manufacture steak sauce, as well, and most major grocery store chains offer private-label brands. These sauces typically mimic the slightly sweet flavor of A1 or Lea & Perrins.

Heinz 57 steak sauce, produced by H. J. Heinz Company, is unlike other steak sauces in that it has a distinctive dark orange-yellow color and tastes more like ketchup spiced with mustard seed. Heinz once advertised the product as tasting "like ketchup with a kick".

See also

 Béarnaise sauce
 Café de Paris sauce
 Compound butter
 Demi-glace
 Henderson's Relish
 List of sauces
 Montreal steak seasoning
 Peppercorn sauce

References

Further reading

British condiments
Irish cuisine
 
Umami enhancers
American condiments